The Highland Hose House is a historic fire station at 1007 Massachusetts Avenue in Arlington, Massachusetts.  The two story brick building was built in 1928 to a design by George Ernest Robinson.  His Georgian Revival design emulates features found in Boston townhouses of the late 18th and early 19th centuries, and its cupola and grasshopper weathervane resemble that of Faneuil Hall.  The station includes a bronze relief of former Chief Charles Goff, executed by noted Arlington resident Cyrus Dallin.

The building was listed on the National Register of Historic Places in 1985.

See also
National Register of Historic Places listings in Arlington, Massachusetts

References

Fire stations completed in 1928
Fire stations on the National Register of Historic Places in Massachusetts
Buildings and structures in Arlington, Massachusetts
National Register of Historic Places in Arlington, Massachusetts
1928 establishments in Massachusetts